The Earth class is a series of 6 container ships built for Zodiac Maritime and chartered to HMM for a period of 12 years. The ships have a maximum theoretical capacity of 10,077 TEU. The ships were built by Daewoo Shipbuilding and Marine Engineering in South Korea.

List of ships

See also 

 HMM Algeciras-class container ship
 HMM Nuri-class container ship
 Hyundai Dream-class container ship
 Hyundai Together-class container ship

References 

Container ship classes
Ships built by Daewoo Shipbuilding & Marine Engineering